WKRG-TV (channel 5) is a television station licensed to Mobile, Alabama, United States, serving southwest Alabama and northwest Florida as an affiliate of CBS. It is owned by Nexstar Media Group alongside Gulf Shores, Alabama–licensed CW owned-and-operated station WFNA (channel 55). The two stations share studios with several radio stations owned by iHeartMedia on Broadcast Drive in southwest Mobile; WKRG-TV's transmitter is located in unincorporated Baldwin County near Spanish Fort, Alabama.

History
WKRG-TV first signed on the air September 5, 1955. The station was founded by the architect and movie theater owner Kenneth R. Giddens, who also put WKRG radio (710 AM, now WNTM, and 99.9 FM, now WMXC) on the air. Owing to the radio station's ties with the CBS Radio Network, WKRG-TV has served as the market's CBS affiliate from its sign-on. It is the only commercial station in the market that has never changed its primary affiliation. WKRG-TV originally operated from studios located on St. Louis Street in downtown Mobile until around 1982, when it relocated its operations to an area near the Bel Air Mall, which Giddens also had a hand in developing. The TV station operates on the bottom floor while the radio stations operate on the second and third floors of the building.

Giddens originally had a 20% stake in WKRG-TV, and the other stakes were held by local businesses and colleges. On April 4, 1958, Giddens sold 50% of the station to Mobile Press-Register, Inc. He regained full control of the station in 1966.

For years, WKRG-TV was the only locally owned station in the Mobile–Pensacola–Pascagoula area. This changed after the death of Giddens in 1993. The radio stations were sold off in 1994, although they remain housed in the same building as the television station. Spartan Communications purchased WKRG-TV in 1998; the station then came under the ownership of Media General after it purchased Spartan in 2000. The station celebrated its 60th year of broadcasting in 2015.

In 2007, WKRG entered into a radio partnership with Clear Channel Communications (now iHeartMedia), in effect re-establishing ties with former sister stations WNTM and WMXC, as well as WKSJ-FM (94.9 FM) and WRKH (96.1 FM). The radio stations were previously partnered with NBC affiliate WPMI-TV (channel 15), an association that ended as a result of Clear Channel selling its television stations (including WPMI) to Newport Television in 2008.

Between the early 1980s and 2012, WKRG served as the default CBS affiliate for the eastern half of the Pascagoula–Biloxi, Mississippi market as that market did not have a CBS affiliate of its own; WKRG was available to cable subscribers in Biloxi and Gulfport, Mississippi, and usually serves the area's "B" CBS station behind New Orleans affiliate WWL-TV. This changed in 2012, when ABC affiliate WLOX signed an affiliation agreement to carry CBS programming on one of its digital subchannels.

On March 21, 2014, LIN Media entered into an agreement to merge with Media General in a $1.6 billion deal. Because LIN had already owned Fox affiliate WALA-TV and CW affiliate WFNA (channel 55), and WKRG and WALA rank among the four highest-rated stations in the Mobile–Pensacola market in total day viewership, the companies were required to sell either WKRG or WALA to another station owner in order to comply with FCC ownership rules as well as planned changes to those rules regarding same-market television stations which would prohibit sharing agreements. On August 20, 2014, Media General announced that it would keep WKRG and WFNA, and sell WALA to Meredith Corporation.

On September 8, 2015, less than nine months after the previous purchase was approved and finalized, Media General announced that it would acquire the Meredith Corporation for $2.4 billion, with the combined group to be renamed Meredith Media General if the sale had been finalized. Because Meredith recently acquired WALA as a required divestment from the LIN Media acquisition, and the two stations continue to rank among the four highest-rated stations in the Mobile–Pensacola market in total day viewership, the companies would once again have been required to sell either WKRG or WALA to comply with FCC ownership rules as well as recent changes to those rules regarding same-market television stations that restrict sharing agreements; sister station WFNA could have legally been acquired by Meredith Media General either by maintaining its new duopoly with WKRG or reuniting it with WALA, as its total day viewership ranks below the top-four ratings threshold. However, on January 27, 2016, Nexstar Broadcasting Group announced that it had reached an agreement to acquire Media General, resulting in the termination of Meredith's acquisition by Media General. The merger with Nexstar reunited WKRG with Panama City sister station WMBB, which was sold by Media General in 2008 to Hoak Media and eventually was acquired by Nexstar after Hoak merged with Gray Television, the owner of its closest competitor, which required its sale.

Programming
Currently, the only syndicated programming broadcast by WKRG-TV consists of reruns of The Big Bang Theory (which aired first-run episodes on the station via CBS). The station also airs paid programming on weekday mornings, making it one of a few CBS affiliates to do so.

Shows that aired on WKRG in the past include Woman's World; The Popeye Show, Rosie's Place and Small Fry News, a show featuring local fifth graders. WKRG-TV was also the longtime home of Congressional Report from 1973 to 2006, billed as the longest-running program of its kind in the nation, featuring local members of Congress giving viewers a local perspective of Washington, D.C. and the central Gulf Coast from their standpoint.

News operation

WKRG-TV presently broadcasts 22 hours of local newscasts each week (with four hours each weekday and one hour each on Saturdays and Sundays).

In 2002, the focus of the station's programming switched to weather and news, and the station's branding was changed to reflect it: it rebranded from "WKRG 5" to WKRG News 5 (based on the station's NewsCenter branding in the 1980s and 1990s) and its slogan touted it as Mobile's "Weather Authority". On October 18, 2010, starting with its 6:00 p.m. newscast, WKRG became the second television station in the Mobile-Pensacola market and the first Mobile-based station to begin broadcasting its local newscasts in high definition.

At one time, WKRG ran an expanded morning newscast until 8:00 a.m. on weekdays, which preempted the first hour of The Early Show, as well as a weekday 9:00 a.m. newscast. The 7:00 a.m. newscast was cancelled in 2008 at CBS' request for its affiliates to air both hours of The Early Show and the 9:00 a.m. newscast was canceled in 2009 due to low viewership and staff reductions by parent company Media General. This newscast returned to the 9 a.m. slot on March 30, 2015, as a half-hour newscast on weekdays. Future newscast expansion has been touted by the station by way of news promos.

WKRG is one of the two remaining stations in the market to start their daily morning newscast at 5 a.m., along with WPMI, which ran a 4:30 a.m. show from September 2013 to June 2015.

On April 20, 2015, the morning newscast began to be simulcast on WFNA, mainly as a stopgap solution due to the sudden cancellation of that station's syndicated morning show, The Daily Buzz.

WKRG became the first Mobile station (second in market overall) to launch weekend morning newscasts on June 20, 2015, from 5–6 a.m. Saturdays and 6–8 a.m. Sundays.

On December 5, 2016, WKRG added newscasts at 4:30 a.m. and 6:30 p.m. The latter replaced The Andy Griffith Show, which moved to sister station WFNA to weeknights at 9:30 following their 9 p.m. news which is also produced by WKRG.

On September 7, 2017, a video of WKRG meteorologist Alan Sealls covering Hurricane Irma, Hurricane Jose, and Hurricane Katia went viral on Reddit and YouTube.

Notable former on-air staff
 Jack Drees
 Estella Payton
 Alan Sealls (now at WPMI-TV)
 Mel Showers
 John Edd Thompson

Technical information

Subchannels
The station's digital signal is multiplexed:

WKRG replaced the Retro Television Network with MeTV on its third digital subchannel in September 2011.

Analog-to-digital conversion
WKRG-TV discontinued regular programming on its analog signal, over VHF channel 5, on June 12, 2009, the official date in which full-power television stations in the United States transitioned from analog to digital broadcasts under federal mandate. The station's digital signal remained on its pre-transition UHF channel 27. Through the use of PSIP, digital television receivers display the station's virtual channel as its former VHF analog channel 5.

References

External links

KRG-TV
CBS network affiliates
MeTV affiliates
Television channels and stations established in 1955
Nexstar Media Group
1955 establishments in Alabama
Ion Television affiliates
Court TV affiliates